Lawrence Halprin (July 1, 1916 – October 25, 2009) was an American landscape architect, designer and teacher.

Beginning his career in the San Francisco Bay Area, California, in 1949, Halprin often collaborated with a local circle of modernist architects on relatively modest projects. These figures included William Wurster, Joseph Esherick, Vernon DeMars, Mario J. Ciampi, and others associated with UC Berkeley. Gradually accumulating a regional reputation in the northwest, Halprin first came to national attention with his work at the 1962 Seattle World's Fair, the Ghirardelli Square adaptive-reuse project in San Francisco, and the landmark pedestrian street / transit mall Nicollet Mall in Minneapolis. Halprin's career proved influential to an entire generation in his specific design solutions, his emphasis on user experience to develop those solutions, and his collaborative design process.

Halprin's point of view and practice are summarized in his definition of modernism:

In his best work, he construed landscape architecture as narrative.

Early and personal life
Halprin grew up in Brooklyn, New York, the son of Zionist leader Rose Halprin and Samuel W. Halprin. As a schoolboy, he earned acclaim playing sandlot baseball. He credited his parents with introducing him to art and supporting his artistic inclinations. His mother, in particular, brought him along on her weekly shopping trips to Macy's, after which they would visit the Metropolitan Museum of Art. Being Jewish, after finishing Poly Prep at 16, he went to Israel on a kibbutz for three years near what is today the Israeli port city of Haifa. 

He earned a Bachelor of Science degree in 1939 at Cornell University, studying horticulture with Professor Lee Gand; he continued his studies at the University of Wisconsin, where he earned a Master of Science. While at Wisconsin, his wife Anna convinced Halprin to visit Taliesin, Frank Lloyd Wright's studio in Wisconsin, which in turn sparked Halprin's initial interest in architecture; after he left Talesin, he went to the school library, where he found and was inspired by Christopher Tunnard's Gardens in the Modern Landscape. Returning to school the following Monday, he spoke with the department head of horticulture, who directed him to the landscape architecture group upstairs, where he met Professor Franz Aust. After two weeks, Professor Aust recommended he continue his studies at the Harvard Graduate School of Design. There he earned a second bachelor's degree (in landscape architecture, awarded 1942), where his professors included architects Walter Gropius and Marcel Breuer. Although Tunnard was teaching at Harvard, he never took a course from him. His Harvard classmates included Catherine Bauer, Philip Johnson, I.M. Pei, and William Wurster.

In 1944, Halprin was commissioned in the United States Navy as a Lieutenant (junior grade). He was assigned to the destroyer USS Morris in the Pacific which was struck by a kamikaze attack. After surviving the destruction of the Morris, Halprin was sent to San Francisco on leave. It was there he would stay following his discharge.

Halprin and his wife, accomplished avant-garde dancer Anna Halprin (née Schuman), were married in 1940. The couple were long-time collaborators; together, they explored the common areas between choreography and the way users move through a public space.  They have two daughters: Daria Halprin, an American psychologist, author, dancer, and actress, and Rana Halprin, a photographer and activist for Romani and human rights.

Career

After his discharge from military service, Halprin joined the firm of San Francisco landscape architect Thomas Dolliver Church. He had become close to the Wursters during their year at Harvard, and Bill Wurster asked him to stop by if he was ever in California. While visiting Wurster's office, he passed by Church's office, which was on the first floor of the same building; Wurster, who was absent at the time, told his associates to hire Halprin if Church would not. When Halprin introduced himself to Church, he was hired immediately and told "I'm going to pay you more than usual, but I don't want you to come back every two seconds and ask for more money." The projects he worked on in this period included the Dewey Donnell Garden (El Novillero) in Sonoma County.

Halprin opened his own office in 1949, becoming one of Church's professional heirs and competitors. His first commission was for Anna's parents, who had recently moved from Chicago; that project was a collaboration with Wurster (Schuman House, Woodside), who was responsible for the house's architecture. At its largest, during the BART landscaping project, Lawrence Halprin & Associates employed 80.

Halprin's work is marked by his attention to human scale, user experience, and the social impact of his designs, in the egalitarian tradition of Frederick Law Olmsted. Halprin was the creative force behind the interactive, 'playable' civic fountains most common in the 1970s, an amenity which continues to greatly contribute to the pedestrian social experience in Portland, Oregon, where "Ira's Fountain" is loved and well-used, and the United Nations Plaza in San Francisco. Park Central Square (1974; Springfield, Missouri) was the first of his works to be listed on the National Register of Historic Places (NRHP), in 2010, followed by the Heritage Park Plaza in Fort Worth, Texas, designed by Halprin and built in 1980, featured by NRHP as its featured listing of the week, on May 21, 2010.

Halprin's final three projects were all completed in 2005: the Letterman Digital Arts Center (for George Lucas), the approach to Yosemite Falls, and the amphitheatre at Stern Grove.

Several of Halprin's works have been threatened by redevelopment as they have aged. Some, such as the Water Garden in Olympia, Washington, have fallen victim to neglect and deferred maintenance, and are in states of disrepair. Others have attracted undesired users (homeless, drug users, and skateboarders); rather than address the social issues, some spaces, such as Skyline Park in Denver, completed in 1976, were redesigned (2003) to increase public usership. Critics argue his pieces have become dated and no longer reflect the direction their cities want to take. Budgetary constraints and the urge to "revitalize" threaten some of his projects. In response foundations have been set up to improve care for some of the sites and to try to preserve them in their original state. Prior to its destruction, Skyline Park was documented as Colorado's first Historic American Landscapes Survey project.

Anna and Lawrence Halprin co-created the "RSVP Cycles", a creative methodology that can be applied broadly across all disciplines.

Projects
Halprin's range of projects demonstrates his vision of the garden or open space as a stage. Halprin recognized that "the garden in your own immediate neighborhood, preferably at your own doorstep, is the most significant garden;" and as part of a seamless whole, he valued "wilderness areas where we can be truly alone with ourselves and where nature can be sensed as the primeval source of life." The interplay of perspectives informed projects which encompassed urban parks, plazas, commercial and cultural centers and other places of congregation:

Notes

Awards 
 1964 AIA Medal for Allied professionals
 1969 Elected fellow in the American Society of Landscape Architects
 1970 Elected honorary fellow of the Institute of Interior Design
 1978 American Society of Landscape Architects Medal
 1979 Thomas Jefferson Foundation Medal in Architecture 
 1979 Gold Medal for Distinguished Achievement awarded by the AIA
 1987 Elected into the National Academy of Design
 2002 National Medal of Arts
 2002 Friedrich Ludwig von Sckell Golden Ring
 2003 ASLA Design Medal
 2005 Michaelangelo Award

Publications
 A Life Spent Changing Places (2011) 
 The Sea Ranch: Diary of an Idea (2003) 
 The FDR Memorial: Designed by Lawrence Halprin (1998) 
 The Franklin Delano Roosevelt Memorial (1997) 
 "Design as a Value System", Places: Vol. 6: No. 1 (1989)
 Lawrence Halprin: Changing Places (1986) 
 Ecology of Form (audio book) (1982) 
 Sketchbooks of Lawrence Halprin (1981) 
 Lawrence Halprin (Process Architecture) (1978)
 Taking Part: A Workshop Approach to Collective Creativity (with Jim Burns) (1974) 
 Lawrence Halprin: Notebooks 1959–1971 (1972) 
 The RSVP cycles; creative processes in the human environment. (1970, c1969) 
 Freeways (1966) 
 “Motation.” Progressive Architecture Vol. 46 (July 1965): ppg. 126-133
 Cities (1963)

References

Bibliography
 Helphand, Kenneth I. Lawrence Halprin. 2017. Amherst, MA: Library of American Landscape History, and Athens, GA: The University of Georgia Press.

External links
 The Telegraph: Lawrence Halprin obituary
 National Park Service article
 Illustrated appreciation of Ira Keller Fountain in Portland Oregon
 Washington Post profile of Halprin on the dedication of the FDR Memorial
Library of American Landscape History: Lawrence Halprin by Kenneth I. Helphand.

American landscape architects
American landscape and garden designers
1916 births
2009 deaths
American designers
20th-century American Jews
Jewish architects
California people in design
United States National Medal of Arts recipients
Cornell University alumni
Harvard Graduate School of Design alumni
Artists from the San Francisco Bay Area
People from Marin County, California
20th-century American artists
21st-century American Jews
United States Navy personnel of World War II
University of Wisconsin–Madison alumni